30 Something is a compilation album by electronic music duo Orbital. It contains singles, album tracks and several new remixes. The release is Orbital's fourth hits collection.

It features re-recordings of some of the band's singles, as well as new remixes of the tracks by other artists, including Shanti Celeste, Dusky, Floex, David Holmes, Lone, Octave One, John Tejada, Joris Voorn, and Yotto.

Background 
Originally to be released in 2019, 30 Something was meant to also include rarities, as a part of the band's new deal with Because Music, which includes a new album in autumn 2022, and a series of reissues of Orbital's albums in 2023. The new versions of the tracks are based on how songs are played during contemporary concerts, compared to their original studio recordings.

Track listing

Charts

Notes

External links 
 

2022 greatest hits albums
Orbital (band) compilation albums